The Aorangiwai River is a small river in the Gisborne district of New Zealand.

See also
 List of rivers of New Zealand

References
 

Rivers of the Gisborne District
Rivers of New Zealand